Agrekon is a quarterly peer-reviewed academic journal concentrating on Food, Agricultural and Resource Economics vis-a-vis to Southern Africa. It is edited by Professor Johann Kirsten, an economics Professor at Stellenbosch University and a director at the Bureau of Economic Research. Agrekon is the official publication of the Agricultural Economics Association of South Africa (AEASA), the professional body of South African Agricultural economists. It is published by Taylor & Francis.

References

Economics journals
Publications established in 1962
English-language journals
Quarterly journals
1962 in economics
Taylor & Francis academic journals